Telik, Inc. was set up in 1988 and was reverse merged into privately held MabVax in May 2014. The major drug of the company was TELINTRA, an investigational agent that was in development for the treatment of myelodysplastic syndrome (MDS) and idiopathic chronic neutropenia.

Controversies

In 2007, a class action was filed against Telik, Inc., alleging that they made false and misleading statements about the Company’s business and prospects during the Class Period.

References 

Companies established in 1988
2014 mergers and acquisitions